Gabonibacter massiliensis  is a bacterium from the genus of Gabonibacter which has been isolated from the human gut microbiota.

References 

Bacteroidia
Bacteria described in 2016